Fik Airfield (also known as Pik)  is an airfield in the Golan Heights, occupied by Israel, near the Israeli settlement and kibbutz Afik. The airfield is used for private aviation activity and operated by the Golan Regional Council. Fik has seen traffic drop in recent years, but is used by Elbit Systems to test their Unmanned aerial vehicles. The airfield was the site of Israel's 2001 Kart racing championship, and there is talk of converting it into a race track.

External links
FlightAware airport information
AccuWeather current weather conditions

Airports in the Golan Heights